John Rous (1710–1760) was a British naval officer.

John Rous may also refer to:

Members of Parliament
John Rous (fl. 1401), MP for Huntingdon
Sir John Rous (died 1652) (1586–1652), MP for Dunwich
Sir John Rous, 1st Baronet (c. 1608–1670), English politician
John Rous (fl. 1410-1414), MP for Ipswich
John Rous (died c. 1454), MP for Wiltshire
John Rous (died 1680) (1610s–1680), English politician
John Rous, 1st Earl of Stradbroke (1750–1827), British aristocrat, racehorse owner and MP

Others
John Rous (librarian) (1574–1652), English librarian
John Rous, 2nd Earl of Stradbroke (1794–1886), British aristocrat
John Rous, 4th Earl of Stradbroke (1903–1983), British aristocrat
John Rous (historian) (1411 or 1420–1492), English chronicler

See also
John Rouse (disambiguation)
Henry John Rous (1795–1877),  British Royal Navy officer